Dhanushkodi Tirtham is one of the Tirthas in the island of  Rameswaram, Tamil Nadu, India. This is located beside the ghost town of Dhanushkodi at the easternmost tip of Rameswaram Island. Rama used his bow's (Dhanush) end (Kodi) to break the bridge - Rama Setu(hence the name). This bridge was used for his army to cross over to Lanka for the victorious war against Ravana.



Legends

Rama & Vibhishana

Ashwattaaman

Faith & Beliefs 

The month of Maasi (Kumbha) (Feb-Mar) is the most
auspicious bathing period. Other auspicious days
include Arthodayam, Mahodayam, days of solar & lunar eclipses.

References in Literature 
References to this Tirtha is made in Sethu Puranam.

Notes

References 

 

Ramanathapuram district
Rameswaram